Behsud or Bihsud may refer to:

People

Behsud (Hazara tribe), a tribe of Hazara people

Places 
 Bihsud District, in Nangarhar Province, Afghanistan
 Markazi Bihsud District, in Maidan Wardak Province, Afghanistan
 Behsud, the capital of Markazi Bihsud District
 Hesa Awal Behsood District, in Maidan Wardak Province, Afghanistan